Duygu Bal (born March 25, 1987) is a retired Turkish volleyball player.

Volleyball career
She is 190 cm and played as a middle blocker. 
She has also played for Emlak Toki, VakıfBank Güneş Sigorta, VakıfBank Güneş Sigorta Türk Telekom, Fenerbahçe from Turkey and Riso Scotti Pavia from Italy.

In November 2014 Duygu Bal announced her retirement from volleyball

Education
She graduated from Ankara University's Faculty of Health Education.

Career

2006-07  Emlak Toki
2007-09  VakıfBank Güneş Sigorta
2008 Women's Top Volley International  Champion
2007-08 Challenge Cup  Champion
2009-10  VakıfBank Güneş Sigorta Türk Telekom
2010-11  Riso Scotti Pavia
2011-13  Fenerbahçe Universal

Awards

 2011-12 CEV Champions League -  Champion
 2012-13 CEV Cup -  Runner-Up, with Fenerbahçe

See also
 Turkish women in sports

References

1987 births
Living people
Sportspeople from Ankara
Turkish women's volleyball players
VakıfBank S.K. volleyballers
Emlak Bankası volleyballers
Fenerbahçe volleyballers
Turkish expatriate volleyball players
Turkish expatriate sportspeople in Italy